"Lady Writer" is a 1979 song by Dire Straits, which appears on the band's second album Communiqué.

Overview
When asked what the song was about, lead singer Mark Knopfler said that he was watching TV one day, and there was a lady writer on the TV, and that's basically where the idea for the song came from. Because the song says the writer is "talking about the Virgin Mary", some have speculated that the writer in question is Marina Warner, a view shared by Warner herself.

Reception
Billboard described the song as a "hypnotic rocker" with "sizzling instrumentation" and "distinctive vocals." Cash Box described it as being "very similar musically to ['Sultans of Swing'], with guitarist/singer Knopfler's invigoratingly unique picking and vocal style."  Record World said that "Knopfler's transcendent writing & guitar skills work well with the magic of Muscle Shoals." Smash Hits said, "This is SO like "Sultans of Swing" it's not true. Look, the only way you'll want this is if you've got (a) more money than sense, and (b) a memory like a sieve." Ultimate Classic Rock agreed it was, "a fast and nimble piece that matches 'Sultans of Swing'."

Charts

References

1979 singles
1979 songs
Dire Straits songs
Songs written by Mark Knopfler